The men's triple jump event at the 2010 World Junior Championships in Athletics was held in Moncton, New Brunswick, Canada, at Moncton Stadium on 24 and 25 July.

Medalists

Results

Final
25 July

Qualifications
24 July

Group A

Group B

Participation
According to an unofficial count, 26 athletes from 22 countries participated in the event.

References

Triple jump
Triple jump at the World Athletics U20 Championships